Titay, officially the Municipality of Titay (Chavacano: Municipalidad de Titay), is a 2nd class municipality in the province of Zamboanga Sibugay, Philippines. According to the 2020 census, it has a population of 53,994 people.

It was declared as a separate municipality on May 24, 1959, by virtue of Executive Order No. 395.

History
In 1933 Custodio P. Mariano Sr., the first Ilocano settler, discovered a small place in the center of the poblacion and registered the name of the place in honor of his favorite cousin back in Luzon who is Cristita Mariano nicknamed "Titay" knowing that a woman's name would bring good luck to the place. The Mariano families were among the first batch of Ilocanos who came from Luzon. Followed by the Dar families who are cousins of the Marianos.

Geography

Barangays
Titay is politically subdivided into 30 barangays.

Climate

Demographics

Economy

Notable personalities

George Hofer (died in 2019) - doctor, former Mayor of Titay (1992-1998); former Representative of the 3rd legislative district of Zamboanga del Sur (1998-2001); and first Governor of Zamboanga Sibugay (2001-2010)

References

External links

 Titay Profile at PhilAtlas.com
Official Website of the Municipality of Titay, Zamboanga Sibugay
 [ Philippine Standard Geographic Code]
Philippine Census Information

Municipalities of Zamboanga Sibugay
Establishments by Philippine executive order